A network termination (NT) (also NTE for network termination equipment) is a device that connects the customer's data or telephone equipment to a carrier's line that comes into a building or an office. The NT device provides a connection for terminal equipment (TE) and terminal adapter (TA) equipment to the local loop.

The network termination used in the specific case of an ISDN Basic Rate Interface is called an NT1.

See also
 Demarcation point
 Network interface device
 User–network interface

Telecommunications equipment
Local loop